C. floribunda may refer to:

 Calceolaria floribunda, a perennial plant
 Calycopteris floribunda, a climbing shrub
 Candollea floribunda, a dicotyledonous plant
 Canna floribunda, a garden plant
 Carmichaelia floribunda, a legume native to New Zealand
 Cassia floribunda, a flowering plant
 Catopsis floribunda, a plant native to Venezuela and the United States
 Cephalanthera floribunda, an orchid with rhizomes
 Cerbera floribunda, an Oceanian plant
 Chailletia floribunda, an African plant
 Chasmanthe floribunda, a crocus native to southern Africa
 Clidemia floribunda, a glory bush
 Colona floribunda, a Southeast Asian plant
 Cratylia floribunda, a legume found in Brazil
 Crocodeilanthe floribunda, a flowering plant
 Cryptantha floribunda, a cat's eye
 Cyanea floribunda, a plant endemic to Hawaii
 Cyphomandra floribunda, a New World plant